Julie Therese Wallace (born 28 May 1961) is a British actress.

Biography
Julie T. Wallace is the daughter of Scottish actor Andrew Keir and his first wife, Julia Wallace. She is the 
sister of actors Sean Keir and Deirdre Keir.

Raised in Wales, she adopted her mother's maiden name professionally after attending the Webber Douglas Drama School. She was active in theatre starting in the late 1970s, including taking a leading role in Edward Bond's The Worlds, directed by Bond himself, in a youth theatre production.

She made her television debut in the title role in the BBC dramatisation of Fay Weldon's The Life and Loves of a She-Devil (1986). She was nominated for the British Academy Television Award for Best Actress for her performance. She later played Rosika Miklos in the James Bond film The Living Daylights (1987), and starred in The Comic Strip Presents... episodes "Les Dogs" (1990) and "Queen of the Wild Frontier" (1993). In 1996, Wallace was featured as Serpentine in Neil Gaiman's BBC miniseries Neverwhere, and played Major Iceborg in the 1997 cult classic The Fifth Element.

In the 2000s, she continued to make regular film and television appearances in supporting roles, including recurring roles as Mrs. Avery from 2000-01 on Last of the Summer Wine and Tony's Mum on Catterick (2004). She appeared in the short film Rita (2008), the 2013 BBC comedy series Big School, and most recently in The Spiritualist (2016).

Film roles
The Living Daylights (1987) .... Rosika Miklos
Hawks (1988) .... Ward Sister
Mack the Knife (1989) .... Coaxer
The Lunatic (1991) .... Inga Schmidt
Anchoress (1993) .... Bertha
The Fifth Element (1997) .... Major Iceborg
B. Monkey (1998) .... Mrs. Sturge
Devil's Harvest (2003) .... Mary Henson
Lighthouse Hill (2004) .... Bunny
Provoked (2006) .... Gladys
Speed Racer (2008) .... Truck Driver
Rita (2008) .... Mum
Cemetery Junction (2010) .... Dignified Woman
Edge (2010) .... Linda
Stag Hunt (2015) .... Mary
The Spiritualist (2016) .... Mother

Television roles 
The Life and Loves of a She-Devil (1986) .... Ruth, the "She-Devil"
French and Saunders (1987) .... Herself
Comic Relief (1988) .... Herself
The Comic Strip Presents (1990) .... Groom's Mother
Selling Hitler (1991) .... Edith Lieblang 
Lovejoy (1993) .... Mrs. Neighbour
The Comic Strip Presents (1993) .... Fiona 
Anchoress (1993) .... Bertha
The South Bank Show (1994) .... Herself
The Detectives (1994) .... W.P.C. Sandy Taylor
Hamish Macbeth (1995) .... Alice Robb
Neverwhere (1996) .... Serpentine
Sharpe's Regiment (1996) .... Maggie
Heartbeat (1993 and 1997) .... Betty Sutch 
Looking After Jo Jo (1998) .... Billy's mother
Last of the Summer Wine (2000–2001) .... Mrs (Lolly Minerva) Avery
My Family (2002) .... Jocelyn, Dental Assistant
Doctors (2003) .... Barbara Byers
Catterick (2004) .... Tony's Mum
Bremner, Bird and Fortune (2005) .... Sarah Kennedy
Hotel Babylon (2006) .... Helen Merchant
Casualty (2010 – 1 episode) .... Registrar
Big School (2013) .... Pat Carrington, the lab assistant
Man Down (2015) .... Teggun

Other work

Wallace provided the spoken narration for Marc Almond's 1990 single "A Lover Spurned" from the album Enchanted.

She also appeared in the video for the Adrian Belew and David Bowie song "Pretty Pink Rose" from the album Young Lions.

References

External links
 
 
 Cast Listing for "Mum's the Word"

1961 births
Living people
People from Wimbledon, London
English film actresses
English people of Scottish descent
English television actresses
20th-century English actresses
21st-century English actresses
Actresses from London